Don't Just Stand There! is a 1968 American comedy film directed by Ron Winston and written by Charles Williams. It is based on the 1966 novel The Wrong Venus by Charles Williams. The film stars Robert Wagner, Mary Tyler Moore, Glynis Johns, Harvey Korman, Barbara Rhoades and Vincent Beck. The film was released on May 1, 1968, by Universal Pictures.

Plot
A famous author, Sabine Manning, has yet to finish her latest sex-themed novel and is on a European cruise with Merriman Dudley, her manager and lover. Her exasperated publisher Martine Randall, in an exchange of favors, asks adventurer Lawrence Colby to pursue her. Colby discovers that Kendall Flanagan, mistaken for Sabine, has been kidnapped.

Kendall's karate skills help her escape when Colby comes to her rescue. Colby learns that Sabine no longer wants to write about sex, so he urges her to finish the completed novel under a pseudonym. Kendall complicates matters by becoming involved in another gangster's crime, but Colby is ultimately able to get everything settled.

Cast 
Robert Wagner as Lawrence Colby
Mary Tyler Moore as Martine Randall
Glynis Johns as Sabine Manning
Harvey Korman as Merriman Dudley
Barbara Rhoades as Kendall Flanagan
Vincent Beck as Painter
Joseph V. Perry as Jean-Jacques 
Stuart Margolin as Remy
Émile Genest as Henri
David Mauro as Jules
Penny Santon as Renée
Joseph Bernard as Police Inspector

References

External links
 
 

1968 films
1968 comedy films
American comedy films
Films based on American novels
Films set in France
Universal Pictures films
1960s English-language films
Films directed by Ron Winston
1960s American films